The Intrusion of Isabel is a 1919 American silent comedy film directed by Lloyd Ingraham and starring Mary Miles Minter, J. Parks Jones, Allan Forrest, and Lucretia Harris. As with many of Minter's features, it is thought to be a lost film.

Plot

As described in various film magazine reviews, Isabel Trevor (Minter) and her brother Bert (Jones), left penniless after the death of their father, sell their Southern home and move to New York, along with their servant Mammy Johnson (Harris). Bert finds work as a valet to Jack Craig (Forrest), but as he does not want his sister to know that he is working as a servant, he tells Isabel that he and Craig are equal partners in a business.

One day, Bert steals a roll of money from Craig and flees to Montana without telling Isabel, leaving her with no way of paying her rent. Still under the impression that Bert and Craig are business partners, Isabel, along with Mammy, moves into "Bert's half" of Craig's house. Amused and enchanted by the girl, Craig permits her to stay. When Craig's sister Marian (Land) arrives for a visit, she is also taken with Isabel and seeks to arrange a marriage between the pair. Her plans are thwarted however, when a young woman named Lois Randall (Shelby) arrives with a marriage license, which she claims that Craig signed at a drunken supper.

Meanwhile, Bert has made good in outdoor work, and returns to New York, seeking his sister and also intending to return the money that he stole from Craig. At the same time he arrives at the Craig residence, it transpires that Lois is in fact a criminal known as "Matrimony Mary" who seeks to extort money from men by the use of fraudulent marriage licenses. With this situation cleared up, and the debt between the prospective brothers-in-law settled, Isabel and Craig are free to wed.

Cast

References

Bibliography
 Donald W. McCaffrey & Christopher P. Jacobs. Guide to the Silent Years of American Cinema. Greenwood Publishing, 1999.

External links

1919 films
1919 comedy films
1919 lost films
Silent American comedy films
Films directed by Lloyd Ingraham
American silent feature films
1910s English-language films
Pathé Exchange films
American black-and-white films
Films with screenplays by Joseph F. Poland
Films set in New York (state)
1910s American films